St Joseph's Higher Secondary School (informally St Joseph's or SJHSS) is a government aided boys school in Thiruvananthapuram, Kerala, India, which was established in 1857.

 Madhu (actor), film actor
 Sathyan (actor), film actor and teacher
 Jagannathan (actor), film actor
 Cherian Philip, Indian politician
 Kadakampally Surendran, Indian politician
 K. Muraleedharan, Indian politician
 Vinu Jose, football player, representing India National Team
 Sajeev Koshy OAM, Australian dental specialist in public dental service and recipient of Australian Honours
 Rojin Thomas, screenwriter, cinema director
 Jobby Justin, Indian footballer
 K. Jayakumar, former chief secretary of Kerala
 A. V. Anoop, film producer

References

External links 
Official website

Boys' schools in India
High schools and secondary schools in Thiruvananthapuram
Lists of schools in Kerala
Schools in Thiruvananthapuram district
Schools in Kerala
Educational institutions established in 1857
1857 establishments in India
1857 establishments in British India